The Rivière Desroses is a river of Martinique. Its lower, canalized part is also called Canal du François. It flows into the Caribbean Sea in Le François.

See also
List of rivers of Martinique

References

Rivers of Martinique
Rivers of France